Sese or SESE may refer to:

Sese, Botswana, a village in Ngwaketse sub-district, Southern District (Botswana)
Sese coal mine, in Central District, Botswana
Sese Islands, an archipelago in Lake Victoria, Uganda
Sese language, a Niger-Congo language of the Central African Republic and the Democratic Republic of the Congo
Single-entry single-exit, in graph theory
Social, Environmental and Scientific Education, a curriculum for primary school in English-speaking countries; see Greenwave
Southern Exposure Seed Exchange, a seed company in Virginia, United States
Swiss Transportation Safety Investigation Board

People
Sese, a Filipino surname derived from the Chinese surname Xie
Juan Sesé y Balaguer (1736–1801), Aragonese composer 
Mobutu Sese Seko (1930–1997), president of the Democratic Republic of the Congo from 1965 to 1997
Neil Ryan Sese (born 1979), Filipino actor
Sese Bau (born 1992), Papua New Guinean cricketer

See also

Se (disambiguation)